Francesco Forte (11 February 1929 – 1 January 2022) was an Italian politician, academic and economist. He was a member of the Socialist Party.

Political career
Forte was Minister of Finance between 1982 and 1983. He was a cabinet member during the Bettino Craxi and Amintore Fanfani governments.

Forte was a member of the Chamber of Deputies from 1979 until 1987. He was later a member of the Senate from 1987 until 1994. Forte served as Undersecretary of the Ministry of Foreign Affairs between 1983 until 1987. He was also Minister of European Affairs between 1983 until 1986.

Forte also was a university professor. In 1961, he began working at the University of Turin. He was an economic adviser for the Socialist Party.

Personal life and death
Forte was born in Busto Arsizio, Italy, on 11 February 1929. He died in Turin on 1 January 2022, at the age of 92.

References

External links
 
 Francesco Forte è il nuovo superconsulente del comune. Articolo del 2012 

1929 births
2022 deaths
Italian economists
Italian Socialist Party politicians
People from Busto Arsizio
Academic staff of the University of Turin
Finance ministers of Italy
Foreign ministers of Italy
Deputies of Legislature VIII of Italy
Deputies of Legislature IX of Italy
Senators of Legislature X of Italy
Senators of Legislature XI of Italy